The Prismatic World Tour Live is a live video album by American singer Katy Perry for her tour of the same name. It was released on October 30, 2015, by Capitol Records. The concert movie was released on DVD, Blu-ray, and for Digital Download. All formats also include 30 minutes of exclusive extras. Russell Thomas directed the concert film and Perry served as an executive producer for the album. Commercially, it topped the music video charts in Australia, Belgium, Italy, and the United States.

Background and tour

It was announced that the final Sydney shows on December 12 and 13, 2014 would be filmed for a concert movie. Almost a year later, on November 23, 2015, it was broadcast on Network Seven. On March 28, 2015, Epix aired a two-hour concert special of the tour, as part of their "Free Preview Weekend". A short video interlude for "Peacock" was broadcast before Perry performed "Teenage Dream". During the exclusive Q&A with Epix, Perry confirmed that she will be making a DVD of the tour. She also revealed that she would change a couple of things for the DVD. Netflix added the tour's concert movie to its streaming service on June 26, 2015. The tour's concert movie was released on DVD, Blu-ray and Digital Download on October 30, 2015. All formats also include 30 minutes of exclusive extras.

Track listing
Credits adapted from DVD liner notes

Bonus Features 
Behind The Scenes
Stage Build Time Lapse
Crew Tidbits

Personnel 
Credits adapted from DVD liner notes.

Director – Russell Thomas
Producer – Simon Pizey
Executive producers – Katy Perry, Steven Jensen, Martin Kirkup, Bradford Cobb, Baz Halpin
Executive producers for Eagle Rock Entertainment – Terry Shand, Geoff Kempin
Direct Management Group – Ngoc Hoang-Del Vecchio, Steven Jensen, Martin Kirkup, Bradford Cobb
Stage Director – Baz Halpin
Music Director – Kris Pooley
Director of Photography – Brett Turnball
Head of Production – Richael French
Recorded and Mixed – Pete Keppler
Mastering and 5.1 Mixing – Adam Ayan
Dancers – Leah Adler, Khasan Brailsford, Lockhart Brownlie, Bryan Gaw, Loriel Hennington, Malik LeNost, Scott Myrick, Cassidy Noblett, Tracy Shibata, Britt Stewart

Choreographers – RJ Durell, Nick Florez
Background Vocals – Lauren 'Elle' Ball, Cherri Black
Guitars – Casey Hooper, Nathan Spicer
Keys – Max Hart
Drums – Adam Marcello
Bass – Joshua Moreau 
Legal and Clearance – Rochelle Winn, Jason Finestone
Product Consultant – Gerry Gallacher
Production Coordinators – Clarice Higgins, Rosie Holley, Mark Fossitt, Paul Bullock
Design – Nikkie Amouyal
Cover Photo – Matthias Vriens-McGrath
Photos – Christie Goodwin

Charts

Weekly charts

Year-end charts

Certifications

Release history

References

2015 video albums
Katy Perry albums
Capitol Records video albums
Concert films
Live video albums